Williamson Simpson Oldham Sr. (June 19, 1813 – May 8, 1868) was an American politician who served in Arkansas state government, and as a Confederate States Senator from Texas from 1862 to 1865.

Biography
Born in Franklin County, Tennessee, Oldham settled at Fayetteville, Arkansas, in 1835, was elected to the Arkansas House of Representatives in 1838 and 1842. He was elected as a justice of the Arkansas Supreme Court in 1842. In 1848 he resigned to run for Congress, but was defeated, thereafter moving to Austin, Texas. He represented Texas in the Provisional Congress of the Confederate States from 1861 to 1862, and was a senator in both the First and Second Confederate States congresses from 1862 to 1865. Oldham died on May 8, 1868.

Legacy
Oldham County, Texas (established 1881), is named after him.

In popular culture
In Harry Turtledove's 1994 alternative history novel, Guns of the South, a "Congressman Oldham" from Texas is mentioned as sponsoring a bill to re-enslave freedmen in a victorious Confederacy. Since the setting was the time of the 2nd Confederate States Congress, it is likely that Turtledove was referring to Senator Oldham.

References

External links

 
 William Simpson Oldham Sr. at The Political Graveyard

1813 births
1868 deaths
19th-century American politicians
Justices of the Arkansas Supreme Court
Confederate States of America senators
Members of the Arkansas House of Representatives
People of Texas in the American Civil War
Signers of the Confederate States Constitution
Signers of the Provisional Constitution of the Confederate States
Texas Democrats
19th-century American judges